Malekabad Zakht castle is a historical castle located in Anbarabad County, Kerman Province, which was constructed during the reign of the Seljuk Empire.

References 

Castles in Iran
Seljuk castles